Trio is the second feature film by South Korean film director Park Chan-wook, released in 1997. 

Similarly to his debut film, The Moon Is... the Sun's Dream, it has been seen by relatively few people outside of Korea.

Plot
Three outsiders are united by a common cause. A suicidal saxophonist named Ahn is pushed over the edge after he discovers his wife’s infidelity, and decides to rob a bank, aided by a violent man (Moon), and a young woman (Maria), who is looking for her missing child.

Cast
 Lee Geung-young as Ahn
 Seon-kyeong Jeong as Maria
 Kim Min-jong as Moon
 Kim Bu-seon as Ahn's wife
 Jang Yong as Captain Choi

Production
Park was asked by film producer Dong-gyu Ahn to make a film similar in tone to Léon, a French film written and directed by Luc Besson. Had never seen the film, but he had previously wanted to make a film about a series of armed robberies committed from 1972 to 1974 in South Korea, and chose to use that as a basis. Park was also initially influenced by the works of Abel Ferrara.

However, as time passed, the production company for the film changed, and the film lost its wild and violent conception, becoming closer to a mainstream film. Park took blame for the films perceived failure, saying that he "regrets Trio much more than [his] first movie."

References

External links
 
 Threesome (Sam-injo) at the Korean Movie Database
 3인조 at Naver 
 

1997 films
Films directed by Park Chan-wook
1990s Korean-language films